Temper of the Times Investor Services, Inc. is a specialized broker/dealer that enroll potential investors in Dividend Reinvestment Plans by buying initial shares and transferring ownership to the investor.  First incorporated in 1981 as Temper of the Times Communications, Inc., it was the publishing company for the financial newsletter The Moneypaper.  In the May 1986 issue of The Moneypaper, Temper first printed an order form for subscribers to use to become enrolled in company DRP programs.  In 1996, Temper split into two separate companies: The Moneypaper, Inc. became the publishing company, and Temper of the Times Communications, Inc. was renamed Temper of the Times Investor Services, Inc. and was registered with the Financial Industry Regulatory Authority (FINRA) as a broker/dealer.  To date, it is the only brokerage whose only service is to facilitate enrollment in Dividend Reinvestment Plans (DRPs or DRIPs), and has been used by The Motley Fool in its "Starting Direct Investment Plans" article, where it was referred to as "the most reasonable service that we know of for enrolling in DRPs."  Forbes.com wrote concerning Temper:

Temper is for investors who "prefer to do their own research on companies, who plan to invest on a regular basis in the companies to build up their holdings and who don't want brokers hounding them all the time with the latest news on another stock," according to a 2008 article on InvestmentNews.com The focus on DRIPs is to "allow small investors to put in minimal amounts of money without paying a broker fee for each purchase. With only a small initial fee, small investors without a lot of money can afford to buy stocks in small amounts, generally getting a better return than they would in the interest on savings or checking accounts at banks."

Other mentions
"Fool.com: Drip Portfolio" cites that through the Temper of the Times service, "anyone can buy initial shares of more than 1,100 companies in order to be enrolled in their Drips."

"How a Fool can invest in Drips" again cites Temper of the Times as an easy way for new investors to enroll in DRIPs.

The Wall Street Journal mentioned Temper of the Times as an organization that will "help you enroll in DRIPs by buying the necessary shares and then getting you signed up."

Temper also appears in the book Raising Money Smart Kids: What They Need to Know About Money—And How to Tell Them, by Janet Bodner, who, in the course of her discussion about DRIP investing writes that "The Temper Enrollment Service specializes in purchasing the number of shares to enroll in a DRP--sometimes as few as one, which lets you bypass high minimums for company-direct plans."

BusinessWeek Online quotes former marketing VP John Sandfort and suggests Temper as a way to bypass brokers using the web.

The Washington Post cites Temper as a way to "avoid brokerage commissions and the hassle of getting a certificate mailed," when enrolling in a DRIP.

External links
 DirectInvesting.com, Temper of the Times' parent site and location of the DRIP search engine.
 Temper of the Times Investor Services, Inc. website.
 Investing Daily

Notes

Investment companies of the United States